Dushak is a small town in the Karakum Desert on the rim of the Kopet Dag mountains of Ahal Province, Turkmenistan.

See also 
 Railway stations in Turkmenistan

References

External links
Flickr images

Populated places in Ahal Region
Allied intervention in the Russian Civil War